Sariya Mahrupovna Zakyrova (born 10 April 1964) is a Russian rower. She competed at the 1988 Summer Olympics and the 1992 Summer Olympics.

References

External links
 

1964 births
Living people
Russian female rowers
Olympic rowers of the Soviet Union
Olympic rowers of the Unified Team
Rowers at the 1988 Summer Olympics
Rowers at the 1992 Summer Olympics
People from Naberezhnye Chelny
Tatar sportspeople
Sportspeople from Tatarstan